Alexander Nikolayevich Pol (20 August 1832 – 26 July 1890) was a Russian archaeologist, geologist, ethnographer and businessman of Baltic German descent. He is most well-known for discovering Kryvbas, a major iron ore region of Eastern Europe.

Biography
Alexander Pol was born into a noble family of Baltic Germans in Maloaleksandrovka, Verkhnedneprovsky Uyezd, Yekaterinoslav Governorate, Russian Empire (present-day Ukraine). On his mother's line he was a far relative of Polubotok and Poletika families. Pol attended local schools before studying at the Imperial University of Dorpat, where he graduated. He studied geology and archeology.

Pol studied the iron ore of Krivoy Rog (present-day Kryvyi Rih, Ukraine) for 15 years and proved its industrial importance. He is credited with discovering the Kryvbas, a major iron ore region, and is most well-known for this. While studying ore deposits, he also made archeological findings and related them to his interest in ethnography.

Pol contributed to the industrialization of the town and its area. In 1881 industrial development began, stimulating the rapid economic growth of Krivoy Rog and, more broadly, of the Yekaterinoslav Governorate of what was then the Russian Empire.

References

1832 births
1890 deaths
People from Yekaterinoslav Governorate
Baltic German people from the Russian Empire
Ukrainian people of German descent
Recipients of the Order of Saint Stanislaus (Russian), 2nd class
19th-century archaeologists
19th-century geologists
History of Kryvyi Rih
University of Tartu alumni